Erkheim is a municipality in the district of Unterallgäu in Bavaria, Germany.

Politics 
Mayors:

 2002–2008: Konrad Engel 
 2008–2014: Peter Wassermann (CSU)
since 2014: Christian Seeberger (Christliche Wählervereinigung Erkheim)

The town is the seat of a municipal association with Kammlach, Lauben, Unterallgäu and Westerheim, Bavaria.

Places of interest
 Catholic church Maria Himmelfahrt
 Protestant church Peter-und-Paul-Kirche
 World`s largest wooden head

Roads 
Erkheim is directly connected to the A96 Autobahn.

Public transport 
Erkheim is connected to the railway-system by the Sontheim/Schwaben railway station. The airport in Memmingen/Munich West is 10 kilometers away and the two international airports of Stuttgart and Munich are reachable within one hour.

Sports 
In the western part of Erkheim is the sports centre of the TV Erkheim located. The grandstand has a capacity of approx. 400 people.

Associations 

Erkheim is characterized by a lively club life. There are among others the following associations: Basketball Club Erkheim 2006 e. V, BBV Ortsverband Erkheim, Bläserschule Günz/Kammel e.V., Bulldogclub Erkheim, Bund der Selbständigen Markt Erkheim, Bund Naturschutz - Erkheim, Erkheimer Klausen, Freibad Markt Erkheim e.V., Förderverein Musikkapelle Markt Erkheim, Heimatpflege Markt Erkheim e.V, Musikkapelle Markt Erkheim e.V., Obst- und Gartenbauverein Erkheim, Reit- und Fahrclub Markt Erkheim e.V., Schützenverein Erkheim 1876, Sängerbund Erkheim, Tennisclub Erkheim, TV Erkheim, WC Hadde Hue

Famous people 

Richard K. H. Burkart, born 1950 in Memmingen/Bavaria grew up in the Memminger Straße 7 in Erkheim and lived there until his move to Berlin. He has published several works in museums. His studio is in Berlin Kreuzberg.

Festivals 
 Every year on the second July weekend is the Erkheimer Volksfest, a beer festival with a big tent.

References

Unterallgäu